Stephen Cooper (born 11 November 1966) is a retired British ice hockey player. He is a member of the British Ice Hockey Hall of Fame and is the older brother of fellow Hall of Fame member, Ian Cooper.

Awards and honours
Named to the BHL Premier Division All Stars second team in 1985.
Named to the BHL British Premier Division All Stars team in 1987 and 1988.
Named to the BHL Division 1 All Stars team in 1989.
Awarded the Alan Weeks Trophy as best British defenceman 1989–90, 1990–91, 1991–92, 1992–93, 1993–94, 1995–96, 1997–98, 1998–99 and 1999–00
Named to the BHL Premier Division All Stars team in 1990, 1993, 1994.
Named World Championships Pool B Best Defenceman in 1993.
Named to the BNL All Stars second team in 2001.
Inducted to the British Ice Hockey Hall of Fame in 2003.

Career statistics

Club

International

References

External links
 British Ice Hockey Hall of Fame entry
 

1966 births
British Ice Hockey Hall of Fame inductees
Cardiff Devils players
Coventry Blaze players
Durham Wasps players
English ice hockey defencemen
Hull Thunder players
Living people
Manchester Storm (1995–2002) players
Newcastle Riverkings players
Nottingham Panthers players
Sportspeople from Durham, England